Syktyvkar Airport  is an airport in the Komi Republic, Russia located just within the city of Syktyvkar. It services medium-sized aircraft. The terminal is on the northwest side of the aerodrome with 10 large parking spaces and 9 small ones. The maintenance area is on the northeast side. The airport supports 24-hour operations.

Airlines and destinations

See also

 Syktyvkar Southwest Airport

References

  

Airports built in the Soviet Union
Airports in the Komi Republic
Syktyvkar